Project Iceworm was a top secret United States Army program of the Cold War, which aimed to build a network of mobile nuclear missile launch sites under the Greenland ice sheet.  The end goal was to install a vast network of nuclear missile launch sites that could survive a first strike.  This was according to documents declassified in 1996.  The missiles, that could strike targets within the Soviet Union, were never fielded and necessary consent from the Danish Government to do so was never broached.

To study the feasibility of working under the ice, a highly publicized "cover" project, known as Camp Century, was launched in 1960. Unstable ice conditions within the ice sheet caused the project to be canceled in 1966.

Political background 

Details of the missile base project were secret for decades, but first came to light in January 1995 during an enquiry by the Danish Foreign Policy Institute (DUPI) into the history of the use and storage of nuclear weapons in Greenland. The enquiry was ordered by the Parliament of Denmark following the release of previously classified information about the 1968 Thule Air Base B-52 crash that contradicted previous assertions by the Government of Denmark.

Description 
The radar and air base at Thule had been active since 1951.

Camp Century was described at the time as a demonstration of affordable ice-cap military outposts. The secret Project Iceworm was to be a system of tunnels  in length, used to deploy up to 600 nuclear missiles, that would be able to reach the Soviet Union in case of nuclear war. The missile locations would be under the cover of Greenland's ice sheet and were supposed to be periodically changed. While Project Iceworm was secret, plans for Camp Century were discussed with and approved by Denmark. The facility, including its nuclear power plant, was profiled in The Saturday Evening Post magazine in 1960.

The "official purpose" of Camp Century, as explained by the United States Department of Defense to Danish officials in 1960, was to test various construction techniques under Arctic conditions, explore practical problems with a semi-mobile nuclear reactor, as well as supporting scientific experiments on the icecap. A total of 21 trenches were cut and covered with arched roofs within which prefabricated buildings were erected. The total number of inhabitants was approximately 200. From 1960 until 1963, the electric supply was provided by the world's first mobile/portable nuclear reactor, designated PM-2A and designed by Alco for the U.S. Army. Water was supplied by Rod wells melting glaciers, and tested for germs such as the plague.

Within three years after it was excavated, ice core samples taken by geologists working at Camp Century demonstrated that the glacier was moving much faster than anticipated and would destroy the tunnels and launch stations in about two years. The facility was evacuated in 1965, and the nuclear generator removed. Project Iceworm was canceled, and Camp Century closed in 1966.

The project generated valuable scientific information and provided scientists with some of the first ice cores, still being used by climatologists as of 2005.

Size of proposed missile complex 
According to the documents published by Denmark in 1997, the U.S. Army's "Iceworm" missile network was outlined in a 1960 Army report titled "Strategic Value of the Greenland Icecap". New tunnels were to be dug every year, so that after five years there would be thousands of firing positions, among which the several hundred missiles could be rotated. The US Army intended to deploy a shortened, two-stage version of the U.S. Air Force's Minuteman missile, a variant the Army proposed calling the Iceman.

Sheet ice elasticity 
Although the Greenland icecap appears, on its surface, to be hard and immobile, snow and ice are viscoelastic materials, which slowly deform over time, depending on temperature and density. Despite its seeming stability, the icecap is in constant, slow movement, spreading outward from the center. This spreading movement, over the course of a year, causes tunnels and trenches to narrow, as their walls deform and bulge, eventually leading to a collapse of the ceiling. By mid-1962 the ceiling of the reactor room within Camp Century had dropped and had to be lifted . During a planned reactor shutdown for maintenance in late July 1963, the Army decided to operate Camp Century as a summer-only camp and did not reactivate the PM-2A reactor. The camp resumed operations in 1964 using its standby diesel power plant, the portable reactor was removed that summer, and the camp was abandoned altogether in 1966.

Ecological impact 

When the camp was decommissioned in 1967, its infrastructure and waste were abandoned under the assumption they would be entombed forever by perpetual snowfall. A 2016 study found that the portion of the ice sheet covering Camp Century will start to melt by 2100, if current trends continue. When the ice melts, the camp's infrastructure, as well as remaining biological, chemical and radioactive waste, will re-enter the environment and potentially disrupt nearby ecosystems. This includes 200,000 liters of diesel, PCBs and radioactive waste.

See also 
Camp Century
Camp Fistclench
Camp TUTO

References

Sources
 

 Camp Century and its PM-2A reactor covered by Suid in "Chapter 5: The Nuclear Power in Full Bloom", pp. 57–80.

 (online)

External links 

 The Big Picture: Camp Century
 Camp Century, Greenland, Frank J. Leskovitz (including good pictures and diagrams)
 U.S. Military Buildup of Thule, Woods Hole Oceanographic Institution
 Camp Century, thuleab.dk
 Atomic Insights Nov 1995 Comments on army film.
 Glaciological Studies in the Vicinity of Camp Century, Greenland
 Documentary film on YouTube

Cold War
Cold War fortifications
Closed installations of the United States Army
Military in the Arctic
Nuclear weapons program of the United States
1958 in military history
Military installations of the United States in Greenland
Glaciology